Herpetogramma subnitens is a moth in the family Crambidae. It was described by Schaus in 1920. It is found in Trinidad and French Guiana.

References

Moths described in 1920
Herpetogramma
Moths of the Caribbean
Moths of South America